Paolo Montagna (born 28 May 1976) is a retired Sammarinese footballer who last played for Cosmos.

He was capped by the San Marino national football team over forty times after making his international debut in 1995.

Honours

Club 
SS Cosmos
 Campionato Sammarinese: 2000–01

Individual 
 Pallone di Cristallo: 2011

References

1976 births
Living people
Sammarinese footballers
San Marino international footballers
Competitors at the 1997 Mediterranean Games
Association football forwards
Mediterranean Games competitors for San Marino